Floored by Four is the debut album by experimental music band Floored by Four. The band consists of Mike Watt (Minutemen, fIREHOSE, The Stooges) on bass and vocals, Nels Cline (Wilco) on guitar, Yuka Honda (Cibo Matto) on keyboard, bass, and glockenspiel, and Dougie Bowne on drums.

The album is divided into four tracks with each titled after a band member. All four were written by Watt.

Track list
Nels (Watt)
Miss Yuka (Watt)
Watt (Watt)
Dougie (Watt)

Reception

The Wall Street Journal called the album "New York avant-garde music down to its raw, improvisational core." Catherine Lewis of The Washington Post credited Watt's leadership for saving the album "from being a scatterbrained, last-minute affair" and found the track "Yuka" to be the standout of the album. John Payne of The Los Angeles Times called their work "risk-taking, spontaneous and thought-provoking electric music".

Tal Rosenberg of Pitchfork was less impressed with the album saying "it sounds like directionless and purposeless noodling."

References

External links
Floored by Four on Chimera Music

Nels Cline albums
Mike Watt albums
Yuka Honda albums
2010 albums